ʻAbd al-Raʼūf (ALA-LC romanization of ) is a male Muslim given name. It is built from the Arabic words ʻabd and al-Raʼūf, one of the names of God in the Qur'an, which give rise to the Muslim theophoric names. It means "servant of the Lenient One".

Because the letter r is a sun letter, the letter l of the al- is assimilated to it. Thus although the name is written in Arabic with letters corresponding to Abd al-Ra'uf, the usual pronunciation corresponds to Abd ar-Ra'uf. Alternative transliterations include Abdul Raouf'' and others, all subject to variable spacing and hyphenation.

It may refer to:

Arts
Abdurrauf Fitrat (1886–1938), Uzbek, cultural modernist active in Soviet Central Asia
Abdur Rouf Choudhury (1929–1996), Bengali writer
Abdul Rauf Anjum (1930–1992), Pakistani writer, poet, philosopher and translator
Abdul-Rauf Khalid, Pakistani filmmaker

Politics / Religion
Mohammed Yasser Abdel Rahman Abdel Raouf Arafat al-Qudwa al-Husseini, or just Yasser Arafat (1929–2004), Palestinian leader
Abdul Rauf al-Kasm (born 1932), Syrian politician
Abdool Raouf Bundhun (born 1937), Vice President of Mauritius
Abdelraouf al-Rawabdeh (born 1939), Jordanian politician
Munshi Abdur Rouf (1943–1971), soldier hero in the Bangladesh Liberation War
Feisal Abdul Rauf (born 1948), Arab-American imam and author
Rana Abdul Rauf (born 1953), Pakistani politician
Mahmoud Abdel Rauf al-Mabhouh, or just Mahmoud al-Mabhouh (1960–2010), Palestinian, Hamas military commander
Abdul Rauff Hibathul Hakeem, or just Rauff Hakeem (born 1960), Sri Lankan politician
Abderraouf Jdey (born 1965), Tunisian-Canadian accused of terrorism
Abdul Rauf Omar Mohammed Abu Al Qusin (born 1965), Libyan held in Guantanamo
Abdul Rauf Khan (born 1969), Pakistani politician
Abdul Rauf (anti-Taliban cleric), imam at the Herati Mosque in Kabul
 "Mullah" Abdul Rauf Aliza, also known as Abdul Rauf Khadim, a Taliban commander, allegedly tied to ISIS at time of his death
 Abdul Rauf Ibrahimi -- Speaker for Afghanistan's Wolesi Jirga

Sports
Mahmoud Abdul-Rauf (formerly Chris Wayne Jackson) (born 1969), American basketball player
Md Abdur Rouf (born 1974), Bangladeshi kabaddi player
Abdur Rauf (cricketer) (born 1978), Pakistani cricketer
Abderraouf Zarabi (born 1979), Algerian footballer
Ahmed Abdel-Raouf (born 1986), Egyptian footballer
Abdul Rauf (cricketer) (born 1998), Pakistani cricketer

Others
Birshreshtha Munshi Abdur Rouf Library and Museum, Bangladesh

References

Arabic masculine given names